The 1993 Australian Swimming Championships were held at the Claremont Superdrome in Perth, Western Australia from 24 to 28 March. They doubled as the national trials for the 1993 Pan Pacific Swimming Championships. They were organised by Australian Swimming.

Medal winners

Men's events

Legend:

Women's events

Legend:

See also
 1992 in swimming
 1992 Australian Swimming Championships

References

Australian Swimming Championships
Australian Swimming Championships, 1993
Swimming
Sport in Perth, Western Australia